Mazière and Mazières are French surnames. It may refer to:

Mazière 
 Alice La Mazière (1880-1962), French journalist
 Christian de la Mazière (1922–2006), French journalist, businessman, and World War II collaborator
 Didier Demazière, French sociologist
  (1924–1994), French archaeologist
  (died 1824), French Hebrew scholar at Collegium Trilingue
 Martine De Mazière (born 1960), Belgian atmospheric scientist
  (1847–1928), French politician 
 Simon Mazière (1655–1722), French sculptor

Mazières
François de Mazières (born 1960), French politician

See also
Demazière (disambiguation)
De Maizière family
Mazières, a former commune in southwestern France

Surnames of French origin